Donald Wayne Stephenson (born September 30, 1988) is a former American football offensive tackle of the National Football League (NFL). He played college football at Oklahoma. Stephenson was drafted by the Kansas City Chiefs in the third round of the 2012 NFL Draft. He was also a member of the Denver Broncos and briefly with the Cleveland Browns before retiring in July 2018.

Professional career

Kansas City Chiefs
Stephenson was drafted by the Kansas City Chiefs in the 3rd round of the 2012 NFL Draft. On August 22, 2014, it was announced that Stephenson violated league rules for performance-enhancing drugs and he served a four-game suspension. During his four seasons with the Kansas City Chiefs, he started 21 games at both tackle spots and guard.

Denver Broncos
On March 9, 2016, Stephenson signed a three-year contract with the Denver Broncos worth $14 million with $10 million guaranteed. In the 2016 season, Stephenson was the Broncos' starting right tackle for most of the season.

In 2017, Stephenson started four of the final five games of the season after losing the starting right tackle job to Menelik Watson and the primary backup job to Allen Barbre.

Cleveland Browns
On March 15, 2018, Stephenson signed a one-year, $2.5 million contract with the Cleveland Browns. On June 15, 2018, Stephenson was suspended for he first two games of the regular season for violating the league's Policy and Program for Substances of Abuse. On July 6, 2018, the Browns placed Stephenson on their reserve/retired list after skipping voluntary OTAs and mandatory minicamp and after being given the two-game suspension.

References

External links
NFL Combine profile
Oklahoma Sooners bio

1988 births
Living people
Players of American football from Kansas City, Missouri
American football offensive tackles
Oklahoma Sooners football players
Kansas City Chiefs players
Denver Broncos players
Cleveland Browns players